AMWA  may refer to:
Advanced Media Workflow Association
Akina Mama wa Afrika
American Medical Women's Association
American Medical Writers Association
Association of Metropolitan Water Agencies